Rhoptropus montanus, the mountain day gecko, is a species of lizard in the family Gekkonidae. The species is endemic to Angola.

References

Rhoptropus
Geckos of Africa
Reptiles of Angola
Endemic fauna of Angola
Reptiles described in 1964
Taxa named by Raymond Laurent